The Eagles Building built in 1916 is an historic Fraternal Order of Eagles meeting hall-office building located at 320 South Main Street in Dayton, Ohio. It is also known as the City Mission.

On November 4, 1982, it was added to the National Register of Historic Places

See also
 National Register of Historic Places listings in Dayton, Ohio

References

External links

National Register of Historic Places in Montgomery County, Ohio
Clubhouses on the National Register of Historic Places in Ohio
Fraternal Order of Eagles buildings
Buildings and structures in Dayton, Ohio